In Aztec mythology, Mētztli (also rendered Meztli, Metzi, literally "Moon") was a god or goddess of the moon, the night, and farmers. They were likely the same deity as Yohaulticetl or Coyolxauhqui and the male moon god Tecciztecatl; like the latter, who feared the Sun because of its fire.

Legend 

The Aztecs believed that they were living in a universe dominated by generations of sun gods, the current one, known as Tonatiuh, was the fifth. The first three previous suns perished by wind storms, jaguars and fiery rain. The fourth was wiped out by a flood  when people turned into fish and spread through the ocean. After the fourth sun perished, the Aztecs believed that the gods assembled to decide which god was to become the next sun. They built a bonfire to sacrifice the next volunteer. Two gods – Nanahuatzin and Tēcciztēcatl – vied for the honor. Nanahuatzin, a poor god, was chosen because he could be spared. Proud Tecciztecatl insisted on the honor, but at the last moment hesitated. Nanahuatzin showed more courage and jumped into the fire. Tecciztecatl gained his courage and followed Nanahuatzin, thus forming two suns in the sky The Moon and Sun were equally bright. Fearing the earth would burn under the light of two luminaries, one of the gods threw a rabbit at Tecciztecatl, and the one struck darkened to become Metztli, today's Moon. Henceforth it is possible to distinguish a figure of a rabbit on the Moon's surface. During a full moon, the "Rabbit in the Moon" becomes readily visible.

Otomi mythology 
For the Otomi people, Zäna was the Moon, the Queen of the Night, probably the main deity. They called her the Young Mother, who represented both Moon and Earth simultaneously. Her spouse, the Old Father, was the god of fire. The Otomi counted lunar months as a period from new moon to new moon. They gave every month 30 days.

See also
List of lunar deities

References 

 
 Esperanza Carrasco Licea & Alberto Carramiñana Alonso, "Metztli, La Luna", Diario Síntesis, 28 de Mayo de 1996

Aztec deities
Lunar deities
Agricultural deities
Night deities